Paul of Taganrog ( - Pavel Taganrogskiy, born Pavel Pavlovich Stozhkov) (21 November 1792- 23 March 1879) dramatically influenced the belief in God and spiritual outlook of inhabitants of Taganrog, Don Land, South of Russia and Ukraine. A plain layman, who lived in Taganrog in the 19th century, he conciliated love and worship of Russian Orthodox Christians, who flowed to him for a piece of advice and spiritual support.

Pavel Pavlovich Stozhkov was born on November 21 (November 8 OS), 1792 in Malorossia guberniya of the Russian Empire (now Ukraine) in a rich noble family. His parents – collegiate registrar Pavel and Paraskeva – were devoutly religious people, they infused in the heart of their son belief in God and piety. Since his youth Stozhkov had felt a flaming love for holy places and pilgrimage. He related about himself: “All my desire was to pray to God, my intention was to go on pilgrimage to rescue my soul, because surrounding life was full of secular vanity and impeded my holy wish”. His father would never let him become a clergyman; he wanted to provide his son with a higher education. Instead of this, the 16-year-old young man followed the voice of his heart, secretly left the home of his parents and went on pilgrimages to monasteries for a year and finally received a severe punishment from his father.

When Stozhkov was 25 years old, his father decided to divide the property between him and his elder brother Ivan. With a comfortable inheritance, the young ascetic dispensed it in Christ's name, the father gave his blessing and young Stozhkov left home forever. He wandered a lot to holy places, including to Kiev Pechersk Lavra and Pochaiv Lavra Lavras that he visited several times; he liked to go to the north of Russia, visited Solovetskiy, Verkolskiy, Kojeozerskiy cloisters and many others.

After 10 years of pilgrimage, Stozhkov settled in Taganrog in the years 1825–1830. Taganrog became Stozhkov’s second home city, where he lived a simple life with no regard for his noble birth. Stozhkov spent the first years of his life in Taganrog renting different flats. Later, he moved into a house on Depaldo Street (now "Pereulok Turgenevskiy"), not far from the Saint Nicholas Church. Thanks to the dean of Taganrog county, archpriest Alexander Klyunkov, this house still exists and is known among people as the “keliya of starets Pavel”.

Stozhkov devoted all of his life to serving God. Although Stozhkov was not in orders, essentially he led an ascetic monastic life in a bustling town; he kept constantly a severe fast and gave himself to incessant prayers. He ate a little. In his old age he drank only one cup of kvass with a soaked rusk a day. He slept also a little, commonly on the bare bench without a pillow. He put on plain peasant clothes and spoke simple Low-Russian language. He told nobody about his noble birth. During all his life he went to pray to the church every day, at night he made all-night prayerful vigils. Insensibly he accustomed his novices to this way of life. While there was the strength Blessed Paul often traveled to holy places, including journeys of 3000 versts on foot to Solovki more than once. But by old age he could go no longer, he dispatched to monasteries his novices and believers, who came to him.

Stozhkov was a preceptor full of love. All of his life, he received everyone in his keliya, liked to present people with gifts, to treat them, gave counsels on how to live and to rescue their own souls. For the righteous life God endowed Paul with gifts of astuteness and prevision, with gifts to work miracles and to heal people. Stozhkov became very famous during his lifetime. In the five final years of his life, Stozhkov ate and slept little and never went out of his house. Stozhkov died on 23rd (10th) of March 1879 at the time of the Great Fast (Lent) at the age of 78.

On 20 June 1999 the Russian Orthodox Church canonized Stozhkov. Many people saw and remember a unique aureole in the sky over the Saint Nicholas Church in Taganrog on the day of his canonization. Today many people come from all corners of Russia to the shrine with his holy relics, which are kept at the Saint Nicholas the Wonderworker Church (1778) in Taganrog. The chapel at the old cemetery is never empty; the lamps in front of holy icons in his keliya never die down.

External links
Russian Orthodox Church in Taganrog (Russian)
Saint Pavel on the Official Website of Taganrog (English)
Orthodoxy in and around Taganrog, photos of Saint Pavel kelya and chapel, and more (Russian)

Starets
Russian saints of the Eastern Orthodox Church
Russian religious leaders
Russian saints
1792 births
1879 deaths